Trent Grant Mitton (born 26 November 1990) is an Australian field hockey player who plays for the WA Thundersticks and the Kookaburras. Mitton is a striker.

Mitton first joined the Australian team as part of the 19-member Champions Trophy squad at the 2010 Men's Hockey Champions Trophy in Mönchengladbach, Germany. He is part of the Australian team at the 2010 Commonwealth Games in New Delhi.

His father is Grant Mitton who represented Australia at the 1984 Summer Olympics in Los Angeles and his grandfather is Don Mitton who did likewise in New Zealand in 1958.

Mitton plays for the WA Thundersticks in the Australian Hockey League. He played for the team in the first found of the 2011 season.

In December 2011, Mitton was named as one of fourteen players to be on the 2012 Summer Olympics Australian men's national Olympic development squad.  While this squad is not in the top twenty-eight and separate from the Olympic training coach, the Australian coach Ric Charlesworth did not rule out selecting from only the training squad, with players from the Olympic development having a chance at possibly being called up to represent Australia at the Olympics.  He trained with the team from 18 January to mid-March in Perth, Western Australia.

Personal
Trent Mitton spends his days away from hockey working as a sport teacher at Chisholm Catholic College.

Achievements 
Mitton was selected in the Kookaburras Olympics squad for the Tokyo 2020 Olympics. The team reached the final for the first time since 2004 but couldn't achieve gold, beaten by Belgium in a shootout.

References

External links
 
  (2010)
  (2014)
 
 
 

Australian male field hockey players
Field hockey players at the 2010 Commonwealth Games
1990 births
Living people
Field hockey people from Western Australia
Field hockey players at the 2014 Commonwealth Games
Commonwealth Games medallists in field hockey
Commonwealth Games gold medallists for Australia
Hockey India League players
Expatriate field hockey players
Australian expatriate sportspeople in India
2018 Men's Hockey World Cup players
Field hockey players at the 2020 Summer Olympics
Olympic field hockey players of Australia
Male field hockey forwards
Olympic silver medalists for Australia
Medalists at the 2020 Summer Olympics
Olympic medalists in field hockey
Sportsmen from Western Australia
Medallists at the 2010 Commonwealth Games
Medallists at the 2014 Commonwealth Games